Juan Carlos Garrido Acevedo (born 4 March 1980) is a Chilean Paralympic powerlifter who competes in international elite events. He is a double Parapan American Games champion and a two-time World bronze medalist.

References

1980 births
Living people
People from Talca
Paralympic powerlifters of Chile
Powerlifters at the 2000 Summer Paralympics
Powerlifters at the 2016 Summer Paralympics
Medalists at the 2011 Parapan American Games
Medalists at the 2015 Parapan American Games
Medalists at the 2019 Parapan American Games
Powerlifters at the 2020 Summer Paralympics
21st-century Chilean people